Celestus duquesneyi, commonly known as Duquesney's galliwasp or the blue-tailed galliwasp, is a species of lizard in the family Diploglossidae. The species is endemic to Jamaica.

Etymology
The specific name, duquesneyi, is in honor of Douglas DuQuesnay.

Geographic range
C. duquesneyi is found in southern Jamaica.

Habitat

Description
Moderate-sized for its genus, C. duquesneyi may attain a snout-to-vent length of almost .

Behavior
C. duquesneyi is terrestrial.

Reproduction
C. duquesneyi is ovoviviparous.

References

Further reading
Grant C (1940). "Notes on the reptiles and amphibians of Jamaica, with diagnoses of new species and subspecies". Jamaica Today. 151–157. (Celestus duquesneyi, new species, p. 157).
Schwartz A, Thomas R (1975). A Check-list of West Indian Amphibians and Reptiles. Carnegie Museum of Natural History Special Publication No. 1. Pittsburgh, Pennsylvania: Carnegie Museum of Natural History. 216 pp. (Celestus duquesneyi, p. 119).

Celestus
Lizards of the Caribbean
Endemic fauna of Jamaica
Reptiles of Jamaica
Reptiles described in 1940
Taxa named by Chapman Grant
Taxonomy articles created by Polbot